The 165th New York State Legislature, consisting of the New York State Senate and the New York State Assembly, met from January 3, 1945, to March 26, 1946, during the third and fourth years of Thomas E. Dewey's governorship, in Albany.

Background
In 1943, the Legislature re-apportioned the Senate and Assembly districts. The total number of state senators was increased to 56. Chautauqua, Dutchess, Monroe, Oneida, Rensselaer, St. Lawrence, Schenectady and Steuben counties lost one Assembly seat each; and New York County lost seven seats. Kings and Westchester counties gained one seat each; Nassau County gained two; Bronx County gained five; and Queens County gained six seats.

Thus, under the provisions of the New York Constitution of 1938, re-apportioned in 1943, 56 Senators and 150 assemblymen were elected in single-seat districts for two-year terms. The senatorial districts consisted either of one or more entire counties; or a contiguous area within a single county. The counties which were divided into more than one senatorial district were Kings (nine districts), New York (six), Bronx (five), Queens (four), Erie (three), Westchester (three), Monroe (two) and Nassau (two). The Assembly districts consisted either of a single entire county (except Hamilton Co.), or of contiguous area within one county.

At this time there were two major political parties: the Republican Party and the Democratic Party. The American Labor Party, the newly organized Liberal Party and the Socialist Labor Party (running under the name of "Industrial Government Party") also nominated tickets.

Elections
The New York state election, 1944, was held on November 7. The two statewide elective offices up for election were carried by Democrats with American Labor and Liberal endorsement. The approximate party strength at this election, as expressed by the average vote for U.S. Senator and Judge of the Court of Appeals, was: Republicans 2,913,000; Democrats 2,432,000; American Labor 476,000; Liberals 320,000; and Industrial Government 16,000.

Two of the four women members of the previous legislature—State Senator Rhoda Fox Graves (Rep.), of Gouverneur; and Assemblywoman Mary A. Gillen (Dem.), of Brooklyn—were re-elected. Gladys E. Banks (Rep.), of the Bronx; and Genesta M. Strong (Rep.), of Plandome Heights, were also elected to the Assembly.

The New York state election, 1945, was held on November 6. No statewide elective offices were up for election. Three vacancies in the State Senate and five vacancies in the Assembly were filled.

Sessions
The Legislature met for the first regular session (the 168th) at the State Capitol in Albany on January 3, 1945; and adjourned on March 24.

Oswald D. Heck (Rep.) was re-elected Speaker.

Benjamin F. Feinberg (Rep.) was re-elected Temporary President of the State Senate.

The Legislature met for the second regular session (the 169th) at the State Capitol in Albany on January 2, 1946; and adjourned on March 26.

State Senate

Districts

Members
The asterisk (*) denotes members of the previous Legislature who continued in office as members of this Legislature. John D. Bennett, William S. Hults Jr, Roy H. Rudd, Fred G. Moritt, Louis L. Friedman, Isidore Dollinger and Mortimer A. Cullen changed from the Assembly to the Senate at the beginning of this Legislature. Assemblymen Arthur Wachtel and Fred S. Hollowell were elected to fill vacancies in the Senate.

Note: For brevity, the chairmanships omit the words "...the Committee on (the)..."

Employees
 Clerk: William S. King
 Assistant Clerk: Pat E. Provenzano

State Assembly

Assemblymen

Note: For brevity, the chairmanships omit the words "...the Committee on (the)..."

Employees
 Clerk: Ansley B. Borkowski

Notes

Sources
 Know Your Legislature in The State Employee (January 1945, Vol. 14, No. 1, pg. 20ff)
 Members of the New York Senate (1940s) at Political Graveyard
 Members of the New York Assembly (1940s) at Political Graveyard

165
1945 in New York (state)
1946 in New York (state)
1945 U.S. legislative sessions
1946 U.S. legislative sessions